Jupukka is a Swedish mountain north of Pajala in Swedish Lapland. Jupukka is 277 metres high.
This mountain marks one of the locations for the Struve Geodetic Arc.

References

Mountains of Norrbotten County